Christopher Thomas Sununu (born November 5, 1974) is an American politician and engineer who has served as the 82nd governor of New Hampshire since 2017. A member of the Republican Party, Sununu was a member of the New Hampshire Executive Council from 2011 to 2017.

Sununu earned a bachelor's degree in civil and environmental engineering from the Massachusetts Institute of Technology. He has served as chief executive officer of the Waterville Valley Resort in New Hampshire. Sununu is a son of former New Hampshire governor and White House Chief of Staff John H. Sununu, and a younger brother of former U.S. representative and senator John E. Sununu.

Sununu's 2021 budget proposal included phasing out New Hampshire's only state income tax—on dividends and interest income (which Sununu states unfairly targets senior citizens more likely to be living off those types of income); slightly reducing selected other taxes; and instituting targeted student loan relief for those entering the healthcare, biotechnology, and social work fields.

In January 2021, Sununu began his third term as governor of New Hampshire. In November 2021, amid speculation that he would run in the 2022 United States Senate election in New Hampshire, he announced that he would instead seek a fourth term as governor in 2022, which he won. This made Sununu the second modern governor of New Hampshire to serve four terms, after John Lynch.

Early life and education 

Sununu is the son of former Governor John H. Sununu and Nancy Sununu. He is one of eight siblings, including older brother John E. Sununu, a former U.S. Senator and U.S. Representative. He was born and raised in Salem, New Hampshire.

His father's paternal ancestors came to the United States from the Middle East around the start of the 20th century, while his paternal grandmother was an immigrant from El Salvador, born to a prominent Salvadoran family of Lebanese, Hispanic and Greek descent who were Greek Orthodox Christians. His father's paternal ancestry is Lebanese and Greek, both from the Greek Orthodox communities in Jerusalem. Despite the family's emigration from Jerusalem, some members of the family were from Beirut. His father's maternal ancestry was Greek and Hispanic. His father, John, was born in Havana, Cuba. His paternal grandfather, also named John, was born in the United States, and most of the last two generations of Sununus were also born in the U.S. His mother, Nancy (née Hayes), is descended from emigrants from Ireland, Scotland and England. When he took office as governor, Sununu was sworn in with a Greek Orthodox New Testament Bible belonging to his family.

Sununu graduated from Thomas Jefferson High School for Science and Technology, in Fairfax County, Virginia, in 1993. He graduated from the Massachusetts Institute of Technology with a B.S. in civil / environmental engineering in 1998. For two months, Sununu attended New York University Tisch School of the Arts as a film student.

Early career 

For ten years, Sununu worked as an environmental engineer designing systems and solutions for cleaning up waste sites under the supervision of licensed engineers. He specialized in soil and groundwater remediation, wastewater treatment plants, and landfill designs. In 2002, he became an "engineer in training" in California.

From 2006 to 2010, Sununu was an owner and director of Sununu Enterprises, a family business and strategic consulting group in Exeter, New Hampshire. It focuses on local, national and international real estate development, venture technologies and business acquisitions.

In 2010, Sununu led a group of investors in the buyout of Waterville Valley Resort, where he worked as Chief Executive Officer, employing over 700 people in the White Mountains region. Sununu led an aggressive expansion effort of the ski resort in cooperation with the United States Forest Service. The resort offers skiing, golf, tennis, mountain biking, and an ice arena.

New Hampshire Executive Council 
Sununu was a member of the New Hampshire Executive Council from 2011 to 2017.

10-Year Highway Plan 
On December 16, 2015, the Governor's Advisory Commission on the Intermodal Transportation (GACIT) presented the 10-Year Plan for 2017–2026 to the governor of New Hampshire. Sununu, as a voting member of GACIT, helped develop the blueprint, which "aggressively addressed financial constraint, assuming federal funding of about $160 million per year."

Ward Bird 
In 2010, Sununu joined the other four Executive Council members in voting unanimously to release Ward Bird from his mandatory three- to six-year prison sentence for threatening another person with a gun. The council voted to grant Bird a full pardon. Bird was convicted of brandishing a gun at a woman who trespassed on his posted property in 2008. But Lynch, who had never granted a pardon during his tenure, vetoed the measure, saying the judicial system had given Bird's case a thorough review and he would not undermine it. The council then immediately voted to commute Bird's sentence, and Lynch let that vote stand.

Managed Medicaid 
In 2011, Sununu led a series of public hearings to review proposals for Managed Medicaid, a program to help New Hampshire Medicaid recipients to coordinate their health care. It also helps Medicaid recipients with chronic diseases like diabetes, asthma, obesity, and mental illness. Through this program, Medicaid recipients have wellness and prevention programs as a part of their Medicaid benefit.

In 2014, a 300-page, $292 million amendment to the state's Medicaid program came before the Executive Council only two hours before the scheduled vote. Republicans Joseph Kenney and Sununu urged Governor Lynch and other Democrats present not to vote for the contract, but lost the vote 3–2, along party lines.

Governor of New Hampshire

Elections

2016

In the general election, Sununu defeated Democratic nominee Colin Van Ostern, 48.8% to 46.6%.

2018

Sununu was reelected, defeating Democratic nominee Molly Kelly, 52.8% to 45.7%. He was endorsed by the New Hampshire Troopers Association, New Hampshire Police Association, Professional Fire Fighters of New Hampshire, National Federation of Independent Businesses, and the International Brotherhood of Electrical Workers Local 104. He was also endorsed by numerous New Hampshire news outlets, including The Portsmouth Herald, The Union Leader, The Eagle-Tribune, Nashua Telegraph, Foster's Daily Democrat, Exeter News-Letter, Seacoast Online, and the Hampton Union.

2020

On May 14, 2019, Sununu announced that he would seek a third term as governor, rather than challenging incumbent Democratic Senator Jeanne Shaheen in the 2020 election.

After securing the Republican nomination, Sununu received 516,609 votes (65.1%) against Democratic nominee Dan Feltes in November 2020, the highest number of votes for an elected official in a statewide race, and outpaced President Donald Trump (365,654; 45.4%) by about 151,000 votes of approximately 793,000 cast, as Trump lost New Hampshire's electoral votes.

2022

On November 9, 2021, Sununu announced his intention to run for a fourth term as governor instead of challenging incumbent U.S. senator Maggie Hassan. He received 78.66% in the Republican primary, defeating Karen Testerman, Thaddeus Riley, and others.

New Hampshire's gubernatorial ballots are still being counted, but , with approximately 95% of ballots counted, Sununu is projected to win with 57.3% of votes counted over Democratic candidate Tom Sherman as well as Libertarian candidates Karlyn Borysenko and Kelly Halldorson. This became the fourth straight split-ticket election in the state when all members elected to Congress were members of the Democratic Party while the elected governor was a member of the Republican Party.

Tenure 
Sununu was sworn in as governor on January 5, 2017. He was sworn in for his second term on January 3, 2019, and his third term on January 7, 2021.

In 2018, Sununu announced the nationwide launch of his Recovery Friendly Workplace Initiative to engage employers and empower workplaces to provide support for people recovering from substance use disorder. More than 40,000 employees in New Hampshire work for a designated Recovery Friendly Workplace. In October 2018, Sununu introduced the state's new "hub and spoke model" for addiction recovery. The model includes nine regional hubs (in Berlin, Concord, Dover, Hanover, Keene, Laconia, Littleton, Manchester, and Nashua), which coordinate with local "spokes" to provide addiction recovery services. Hubs receive $9 million a year, stemming from $45.8 million in federal aid to combat the state's opioid epidemic.  In March 2019, Sununu announced that an additional $12 million had been allocated to New Hampshire to fight the opioid epidemic.

On May 3, 2019, Sununu vetoed a bill that would have repealed the death penalty. He signed the veto at a community center named after Michael Briggs; as drafted, the bill would not have applied to Michael Addison (who killed Briggs in 2006). The veto was overridden.

During the COVID-19 pandemic, Sununu has criticized members of Congress and members of the Biden administration for the lack of relief packages. He has also criticized members of Congress for getting early access to COVID-19 vaccines. In November 2020, Sununu instituted a statewide mask mandate, which sparked protests outside his house. He opposed what he characterized as federal overreach on mandates, saying, "I am as pro-vaccine as it gets, but I do not support this mandate from Washington, as it is not the answer."

2024 presidential candidacy

In January 2023, Sununu said he was considering a White House bid in 2024, but noted, "I really don't have a timeline."

Political positions 
WMUR considers Sununu a moderate Republican. According to National Review, he is a "fiscally conservative" and "socially moderate" politician in a similar vein to Rockefeller Republicans. He has also been described as philosophically a "hardcore libertarian".

Sununu vetoed 57 bills as governor in 2019.

Donald Trump 
Unlike other moderate Northeast Republican governors, like Charlie Baker, Larry Hogan, or Phil Scott, all of whom chose not to support President Trump for reelection in 2020, Sununu did, and voted for him. He revealed in May 2019 that former Massachusetts governor Bill Weld approached him to discuss a potential primary challenge to Trump in 2020, but Sununu described himself as a "Trump guy through and through." But in the aftermath of Trump's attempts to overturn the 2020 election, Sununu accepted Joe Biden's victory, and he has since become critical of Trump, once calling him "fucking crazy". But Sununu has said he will still vote for Trump if he is the Republican nominee for president in 2024.

Economic and fiscal 

Sununu opposes New Hampshire's 5% tax on dividends and interest income. After his  2020 reelection, he called for newly elected Republican majorities in the New Hampshire House and Senate to pass a law phasing out this tax by 2026, saying that it unfairly targets senior citizens living off of these types of income and their retirement accounts. He also sought to slightly reduce other taxes, and to institute student loan relief for those going into health care and social work.

Sununu has supported tax cuts for businesses and a reduction in property taxes. After the 2018 midterm elections, which gave Democrats control of the New Hampshire legislature, Sununu vowed to veto their proposal to create a broader state income tax, as well as several other new taxes and fees. Sununu signed a bill making it easier for medical facilities to be licensed to treat veterans. He also opposed the Senate's Republican health care plan in 2017, citing that the proposal would negatively affect Medicaid and addiction recovery services in the state.

Sununu supports legislation to provide state-funded "school choice vouchers to disadvantaged and low-income students"; such vouchers could be used at religious and private schools. After the 2018 midterm elections, in which Democrats regained control of the New Hampshire legislature, Sununu vetoed a bill to establish a paid family leave policy that would have instituted a statewide payroll tax.

Sununu nominated 27 New Hampshire "opportunity zones" to receive federal tax breaks for low-income areas. These included Waterville Valley, a low-income town that is the locale of the Sununu family's Waterville Valley Resorts. The family and resort did not take advantage of the tax breaks but later expanded their investment in the resort, allowing them to, if they later pursued the tax advantages, "defer paying taxes on those gains for seven years and get a 15% discount on the tax liability. In addition, they could avoid paying taxes on any future capital gains from the resort if they hold on to it for a decade".

Energy 
In late June 2018 and again on June 4, 2019, Sununu vetoed New Hampshire Senate Bill 446, which would have increased the limit for renewable energy projects participating in net metering from 1 megawatt (MW) to 5 MW. A veto override vote held in 2018 by the New Hampshire House of Representatives failed to achieve a two-thirds majority.

In a statement about his veto of Senate Bill 446 (and a separate bill, Senate Bill 365), Sununu said the bills would collectively cost New Hampshire electric ratepayers (consumers) around $100 million over three years. "While I agree that expanding net metering could be a benefit to our state, Senate Bill 446 would cost ratepayers at least $5 to $10 million annually and is a handout to large-scale energy developers", Sununu said. "These immense projects should use incentives already available and compete on their own merits."

In his 2020 budget address, Sununu proposed the creation of the New Hampshire Department of Energy, which he said will "streamline government" and "eliminate redundancies." According to Sununu, "The Department will combine many of the current functions of the Public Utilities Commission with the Office of Strategic Initiatives and ensures that a unified approach to energy policy, while keeping core regulatory functions separate from the programmatic and policy elements." One focus of the Department will be the development of offshore wind along New Hampshire's shoreline in the Gulf of Maine, a longstanding priority of Sununu's.

Social 
Sununu has said that he does not oppose abortion rights, but does not support taxpayer funding for abortions and supports a ban on partial-birth abortion. In 2015, as a member of the New Hampshire Executive Council, he voted to defund Planned Parenthood. He later reversed his position and voted to restore the funding. In 2018, he said "I'm pro-choice. I support Roe v. Wade." Sununu had supported other contracts with Planned Parenthood. In 2022, in response to reports that the Supreme Court may overturn Roe v. Wade, he said, "I'm a pro-choice governor" and that he supports abortion rights in New Hampshire.

Sununu vetoed a bill that would ban people from carrying firearms on school property.

During a 2016 gubernatorial debate, he said he opposed the settling of 10,000 Syrian refugees in the United States.

In 2017, Sununu signed Senate Bill 12, which enacted constitutional carry in New Hampshire.

In 2018, Sununu said he would refuse to send the New Hampshire National Guard to the US-Mexico border to enforce Trump's "zero-tolerance" policy in regard to undocumented immigrants.

Sununu is seen as supportive of LGBT rights; he said that he does not get involved with the state's GOP platform issues and spoke at an event for the Log Cabin Republicans, a political action committee that supports same-sex marriage and other gay rights. In 2018, Sununu signed into law two bills intended to protect LGBT rights, one prohibiting discrimination based on gender identity in housing, employment, and public accommodations and one banning conversion therapy from being used on minors. In 2019, he allowed a bill to become a law without his signature that created a non-binary gender option for driver's licenses. In 2019, however, he vetoed a bill to make it easier for transgender people to change their birth certificates, saying he believed the process was fine as is. Proponents of the bill responded that Sununu lacked understanding of the challenges the transgender community faced. In 2022, Sununu vetoed a "parental bill of rights" law which would have forced schools to out trans children to their parents.

Sununu opposes legalizing recreational marijuana. In December 2018, he said he would "absolutely" veto legislation "regardless of what the language looks like." In 2022, Sununu reversed his opinion on the legalization of recreational marijuana during a conversation with the New England Council.

In 2020, Sununu joined Democrats in supporting permanent funding for conservation efforts in the U.S. and particularly in New Hampshire.

Law enforcement reform 
After the murder of George Floyd, Sununu established the New Hampshire Commission on Law Enforcement Accountability, Community, and Transparency (LEACT). LEACT was created to examine police training and procedures and to report and investigate police misconduct and the relationship between law enforcement and New Hampshire communities. It comprises people from civil rights organizations, mental health organizations, the president of the Manchester NAACP, law enforcement representatives, the executive director of the New Hampshire Commission for Human Rights, the director of the New Hampshire Police Standards and Training council, and the New Hampshire Attorney General.

In September 2020, LEACT submitted 50 recommendations to Sununu, ranging from the creation of an independent oversight commission to review allegations of police misconduct to the recommendation that all police officers in the state wear body cameras. Sununu endorsed all the recommendations, and said he would direct the New Hampshire State Police to comply with the recommendation to use body cameras.

After the release of LEACT's initial recommendations, Sununu said, "As I have long said, New Hampshire has some of the best law enforcement in the country, but there is always room to improve, grow, and adapt."

COVID-19 
In December 2021, Sununu asked President Joe Biden and FEMA for emergency response teams to deal with a surge in COVID-19 cases in New Hampshire.

Personal life 

Sununu is an active skier and rugby player. In 1998, he completed a five-month through-hike of the Appalachian Trail from Maine to Georgia. He met his wife, Valerie, in college; they married in 2001. The couple and their three children, Calvin, Edith and Leonardo, live in Newfields, New Hampshire.

Electoral history 
Executive Council 1st term

In 2010, Sununu defeated incumbent Executive Councilor Beverly Hollingworth by 53,053 votes to 41,875, or 55.9% to 44.1%.

Executive Council 2nd term

In 2012, Sununu defeated Bill Duncan, 75,856 votes to 55,432, or 55.2% to 40.3%, with 4.5% going to Libertarian candidate Michael Baldassarre.

Executive Council 3rd term

In 2014, Sununu defeated Robin McLane, 61,601 votes to 38,420, or 61.6% to 38.4%.

References

External links

Office of the Governor official government site
Chris Sununu for Governor official campaign site

Councilor Christopher T. Sununu at the New Hampshire Executive Council, District 3, archived
ABC News article on Sununu

|-

|-

|-

|-

1974 births
American people of English descent
American people of Irish descent
American people of Scottish descent
American politicians of Salvadoran descent
American politicians of Lebanese descent
American people of Greek descent
American politicians of Palestinian descent
Hispanic and Latino American state governors of the United States
Republican Party governors of New Hampshire
Living people
MIT School of Engineering alumni
Members of the Executive Council of New Hampshire
People from Salem, New Hampshire
Sununu family
Thomas Jefferson High School for Science and Technology alumni
21st-century American politicians